Polanowo  (German 1939-1945 Paulen) is a village in the administrative district of Gmina Powidz, within Słupca County, Greater Poland Voivodeship, in west-central Poland.

The village has a population of 60.

References

Villages in Słupca County